Peter P Hill (born 14 June 1948) is a British pianist and musicologist.

Biography
Hill, a native of Lyndhurst (Hampshire), was acquainted with the French composer Olivier Messiaen, and has written a book about him. As well as playing the complete works of Messiaen, he is also known for his performances of other 20th-century piano repertoire.

Having read music at Oxford then continued his studies at the Royal College of Music, both with Cyril Smith, he is now an Emeritus Professor of Music at the University of Sheffield. He is a Fellow of the Royal Northern College of Music.

In November 2013 he gave the world premiere of Messiaen's piano piece La Fauvette passerinette (1961), which he discovered and edited for performance.

Publications 
 
 
 
 Hill's recordings of Messiaen's piano music, made under the guidance of the composer, for Unicorn-Kanchana, are now available on the Regis label.

References

External links
Peter Hill at the University of Sheffield
Read some of Peter Hill's articles on Messiaen
Peter Hill's professional website

Academics of the University of Sheffield
Male classical pianists
English classical pianists
Living people
1948 births
21st-century classical pianists
21st-century British male musicians
Stravinsky scholars
Messiaen scholars